Warbus (also known as War Bus) is a 1985 Italian-Philippine internationally co-produced action film directed by Ferdinando Baldi under the pseudonym "Ted Kaplan".

Premise
During the Vietnam War, three soldiers are escorting an old school bus carrying a group of missionaries. Completely surrounded by enemy soldiers, the heroes have a unique chance: make the vehicle reach an old military base, where they can call the rescue.

Cast
 Daniel Stephen as Sgt. Dixie
 Romano Kristoff as Gus
 Urs Althaus as Ben
 Gwendolyn Hung as Anne
 Ernie Zarate as Major Kutran
 Don Gordon Bell as Ronnie
 Zeny R. Williams 
 Josephine Sylva

Release
The film was released in Portugal on March 25, 1985.

Notes

External links 
 

1985 films
English-language Italian films
Italian action films
Films directed by Ferdinando Baldi
Philippine action films
Films set in Vietnam
Vietnam War films
Regal Entertainment films
1985 action films
1980s English-language films
1980s Italian films